Kilmacrennan ( or ), also Kilmacrenan, is a village, townland and civil parish in County Donegal, Ireland. The village population was 753, as of the 2016 census. The village's population has increased steadily over the last decade with many new housing developments catering, in particular, for an overspill population from Letterkenny. Kilmacrennan was historically the caput of its eponymous Barony of Kilmacrennan, of the eight Baronies of Donegal.

The Battle of Kilmacrennan was fought near the village in 1608 during O'Doherty's Rebellion.

Geography
Kilmacrennan lies on the N56 10 km northwest of Letterkenny, which is the largest town in County Donegal. The village's name 'Cill Mhic nÉanáin' means 'the church of the sons of Éanán'.

Two rivers flow through the village, the Lennon and the Lurgy. Traditionally, the river Lennon was renowned for salmon fishing; however, the salmon numbers have dropped dramatically in recent years. Most anglers blame pollution for this. The salmon and trout population is slowly increasing but will take a number of years for it to reach its old level.

Amenities

A 1916 Remembrance Garden was opened to the public in 2016 to mark the centenary of the Easter Rising. There are three churches: a Catholic church and the Church of St Finian and St Mark Church of Ireland in the village itself, as well as a Presbyterian Church in the townland of Leiter about 3 km away. Kilmacrennan national school is also located beside the Catholic church. It has approximately 185 pupils. It opened in 2008. The previous national school, which opened in 1935, is across the road.

Industry
North West Aluminium manufacture and produce a large range of aluminium & pvc roofline trims. They won the Donegal County Enterprise 'Business of the year' award in 2008.

Sport
Kilmacrennan has a soccer club called Kilmacrennan Celtic, founded in 1977 and formerly known as Lurgy Celtic. They have a senior and reserve team in the Donegal League and also have underage teams from u-8 level to u-18 level.

Notable people
 Arthur Kenney, Dean of Achonry 1812–1821
 Michael Logue, Archbishop of Armagh 1887–1924
 Bernard McGlinchey, senator and businessman
 Cahir O'Doherty was killed near here, was decapitated and his head was put on public display
 John O'Donnell, businessman and politician

See also
 List of populated places in Ireland
 List of abbeys and priories in the Republic of Ireland (County Donegal)
 Kilmacrennan railway station

References

Towns and villages in County Donegal
Townlands of County Donegal
Kilmacrenan